Ravenmeols is a Metropolitan Borough of Sefton ward in the Sefton Central Parliamentary constituency that covers the village of Ince Blundell and the nearby hamlets of Lady Green and Carr Houses, the village of Little Altcar,  and the eastern half of the town of Formby including the eastern half of the area known as Freshfield. The population of this ward taken at the 2011 census was 12,065.

Councillors

Election results

Elections of the 2010s

References

Wards of the Metropolitan Borough of Sefton